Political parties are illegal in Bahrain but operate as de facto political parties under the term political societies. Political societies in Bahrain range from the communist left to the Islamist right.

Current

Banned Parties 
registered opposition:
 Al Wefaq
 National Democratic Action Society
 Islamic Action Society
The unlicensed opposition:
 Bahrain Freedom Movement
 Haq Movement
 Al Wafa' Islamic Movement
 February 14 Youth Coalition
 Al-Ashtar Brigades
 Al-Mukhtar Brigades

See also
Politics of Bahrain
Bahraini opposition
List of ruling political parties by country

Bahrain
 
Politics of Bahrain
Political parties
Political parties
Bahrain